Acrobasis niveicinctella is a species of snout moth in the genus Acrobasis. It was described by Ragonot in 1887. It is found in Russia and Turkmenistan.

References

Moths described in 1887
Acrobasis
Moths of Asia